Odette Duriez (born 7 May 1948 in Merville, Nord) is a French politician who is a former member of the National Assembly of France.  She represents the Pas-de-Calais department, and is a member of the Socialist Party.

References

1948 births
Living people
People from Nord (French department)
Socialist Party (France) politicians
Women mayors of places in France
20th-century French women politicians
Women members of the National Assembly (France)
Deputies of the 13th National Assembly of the French Fifth Republic
21st-century French women politicians
Senators of Pas-de-Calais
Women members of the Senate (France)